Benzofuranylpropylaminopentane (BPAP, (-)-BPAP, BFPAPn, or BFPAP) is a drug with an unusual monoamine-release potentiating mechanism of action. It can loosely be grouped with the stimulant or antidepressant drug families, but its mechanism of action is quite different.

BPAP (along with another similar compound PPAP) is classified as a catecholaminergic and serotonergic activity enhancer. This means that it stimulates the impulse propagation mediated transmitter release of the neurotransmitters dopamine, norepinephrine and serotonin in the brain. However, unlike stimulant drugs like amphetamine, which release a flood of these neurotransmitters in an uncontrolled manner, BPAP instead only increases the amount of neurotransmitter that gets released when a neuron is stimulated by receiving an impulse from a neighbouring neuron. So while both amphetamine and BPAP increase the amount of neurotransmitters that get released, amphetamine causes neurons to dump neurotransmitter stores into the synapse regardless of external input, while with BPAP the pattern of neurotransmitter release is not changed, but when the neuron would normally release neurotransmitter, a larger amount than normal is released.

Other drugs which produce this effect are the endogenous trace amines phenethylamine and tryptamine, and the neuroprotective MAO-B inhibitor selegiline. However, while selegiline is a potent monoamine oxidase inhibitor, BPAP is only a weak MAO-A inhibitor at high doses, and at low doses produces only the activity enhancer effect.

BPAP has been shown to have neuroprotective effects similar to those of selegiline, and has been researched for the treatment of Alzheimer's disease, Parkinson's disease and clinical depression.

References 

Benzofuranethanamines
Stimulants
Neuroprotective agents